The Longhorn League was the name of a Minor league baseball circuit that operated from  through  in the Southwestern United States. In , it was renamed the Southwestern League and operated through  before changing its name to the Sophomore League. Joe Bauman hit 72 home runs in 1954 to set the minor league record, while playing for the Roswell Rockets.

History
The Longhorn League was a high–offense league that operated from 1947 through 1955. In 1956, it was renamed the Southwestern League. A league with only three teams ever affiliated with major league clubs, all for one year only, the league was home to veteran minor leaguers who were no longer of interest to major league teams. In two of the league's nine seasons, a Longhorn League player posted the top average in the minors – Jim Prince in 1947 and Tom Jordan in 1955. A .400 average or .700 slugging in this league was not uncommon. The league is notable for Joe Bauman setting the all–time minor-league home run record in 1954 with 72 home runs.

Cities represented

Artesia, NM: Artesia Drillers 1951–1953; Artesia Numexers 1954–1955
Ballinger, TX: Ballinger Cats 1947–1950
Big Spring, TX: Big Spring Broncs 1947–1950; Big Spring Cosden Cops 1955
Carlsbad, NM: Carlsbad Potashers 1953–1957
Del Rio, TX: Del Rio Cowboys 1948
Hobbs, NM: Hobbs Sports 1955
Lamesa, TX: Lamesa Lobos 1953 
Midland, TX: Midland Indians 1947, 1949–1950, 1954–1955
Odessa, TX: Odessa Oilers 1947–1954; Odessa Eagles1955 
Roswell, NM: Roswell Rockets 1949–1955
San Angelo, TX: San Angelo Colts 1948–1955
Sweetwater, TX: Sweetwater Sports 1947–1948; Sweetwater Swatters 1949–1951; Sweetwater Braves 1952; Sweetwater Spudders 1954 
Vernon, TX: Vernon Dusters 1947–1952
Wichita Falls, TX: Wichita Falls Spudders 1954 
Winters, TX & Ballinger, TX: Winters-Ballinger Eagles 1953

Championship teams
1947 – Ballinger Cats
1948 – Midland Indians
1949 – Big Spring Broncs
1950 – Odessa Oilers
1951 – Odessa Oilers
1952 – Midland Indians
1953 – Carlsbad Potashers
1954 – Artesia NuMexers
1955 – San Angelo Colts

Standings & statistics
1947 Longhorn League
schedule
Playoffs: Big Springs 4 games, Sweetwater 3; Ballinger 4 games, Midland 3. Finals: Ballinger 4 games, Big Springs 2. 

 
1948 Longhorn League
schedule
Playoffs: Veron 4 games, Big Spring 2; Midland 4 games, Odessa 0. Finals: Midland 4 games, Vernon 3. 

1949 Longhorn League
schedule
Playoffs: Big Spring 4 games, San Angelo 0; Midland 4 games, Vernon 1; Finals: Big Spring 4 games, Midland 0. 

1950 Longhorn League
schedule
Playoffs: Odessa 4 games, Vernon 1; Big Spring 4 games, Roswell 0. Finals: Odessa 4 games, Big Spring 3. 

1951 Longhorn League
schedule
Playoffs: Odessa 4 games, San Angelo 1; Roswell 4 games, Big Spring 2. Finals: Odessa 4 games, Roswell 2. 
 

1952 Longhorn League
schedule
Playoffs: Odessa 4 games, Artesia 1; Midland 4 games, Big Spring 0; Finals: Midland 4 games, Odessa 2. 
 

1953 Longhorn League
schedule
Lamesa/Winters–Ballinger disbanded June 7; Big Spring disbanded July 31. Playoffs: Carlsbad 4 games, Artesia 3; Midland 4 games, San Angelo 3; Finals: Carlsbad 4 games, Midland 2.

1954 Longhorn League
schedule
Wichita Falls moved to Sweetwater May 6. Playoffs: Artesia 4 games, Midland 2; Carlsbad 4 games, Roswell 2; Finals: Artesia 4 games, Carlsbad 2.

1955 Longhorn League
schedule
 Playoffs: San Angelo 4 games, Carlsbad 1; Roswell 4 games, Artesia 3. Finals: San Angelo 4 games, Roswell 0.

League Records 1947-1955

Sources
Encyclopedia of Minor League Baseball – Lloyd Johnson, Miles Wolff. Publisher: Baseball America, 1993. Language: English. Format: Paperback, 420pp.

References

Defunct minor baseball leagues in the United States
Sports leagues established in 1947
1955 disestablishments in the United States
1947 establishments in the United States
Defunct professional sports leagues in the United States
Baseball leagues in Texas
Baseball leagues in New Mexico
Sports leagues disestablished in 1955